The  was a railway line in Japan, operated by the East Japan Railway Company (JR East) between Moichi Station in Miyako, Iwate and Iwaizumi Station in Iwaizumi, Iwate.

Operations on the line were suspended on July 31, 2010, when a train derailed due to a landslide, which occurred between Oshikado Station and Iwate-Ōkawa Station. Bus services have since substituted for trains, and the line was formally closed on 1 April 2014.

Service outline
Prior to 2010, there were four local services a day to Iwaizumi Station (one of which terminated at Iwate-Wainai Station), and four to Moichi Station or Miyako Station (one of which started from Iwate-Wainai Station); relatively infrequent by Japanese standards.

Stations

History
Although approved for construction in 1922 under the Railway Construction Act, the first section to Iwate-Wainai opened in 1942 to enable brick-making clay to be hauled. The line was extended to Oshikado in 1944, and following completion of the 2987m Oshikado Tunnel, to Utsuno Station (since closed) in 1947.

In 1948 the line was closed for 4 months due to landslide damage. The line was extended to Iwate-Okawa in 1957, and was completed to Iwaizumi in 1972.

Freight services ceased in 1982.

Suspension and closure
Operations on the line were suspended on July 31, 2010, when a train derailed due to a landslide, which occurred between Oshikado Station and Iwate-Ōkawa Station. Trains were substituted by bus services.

After investigating the accident and the condition of the line, JR East announced on March 30, 2012, that it was giving up on the idea of restoring the line. The company claimed that the cost expected to secure the safety of the line would be about 1.3 billion yen and that it could not afford to spend such an amount considering its very small public demand. According to the company, annual revenue of the line was 8.4 million yen in 2009, with the average daily passenger count being 49, while the cost to operate the line was 2.65 billion yen, resulting in an annual operating loss of 2.57 billion yen. Local governments, including Iwate Prefecture, raised objection to the decision.

In November 2013, JR East announced that agreement had been reached with local governments to formally close the line, which occurred on 1 April 2014.

After closure
Since 1 April 2014, Higashinihon Kotsu has operated Iwaizumi-Moichi Line which is a bustitution.

References
This article incorporates material from the corresponding article in the Japanese Wikipedia.

 
Lines of East Japan Railway Company
Rail transport in Iwate Prefecture
1067 mm gauge railways in Japan
Railway lines closed in 2013